The Währinger Tempel was a synagogue in the district of Währing in Vienna. Schopenhauerstraße 41. It was destroyed during the Reichskristallnacht in 1938.

Literature 
 Bob Martens, Herbert Peter: "The Destroyed Synagogues of Vienna - Virtual city walks". Vienna: LIT Verlag, 2011.

Synagogues in Vienna
Vienna Wahringer Tempel
Synagogues destroyed during Kristallnacht (Austria)
Former synagogues in Austria